Chuvash may refer to:

Chuvash people
Chuvash language
Chuvashia (Chuvash Republic), within Russia
 Chuvash Autonomous Oblast (1920–1925), within the Soviet Union
 Chuvash Autonomous Soviet Socialist Republic (1925–1992), within the Soviet Union
Çuvaş, an Azerbaijani village

See also 
 Chumash (disambiguation)

Language and nationality disambiguation pages